Poem, ballader och lite blues (English: Poems, ballads and a little blues) is the sixth studio album by Swedish-Dutch folk singer-songwriter Cornelis Vreeswijk. All songs from the album were newly recorded in 2007 by other artists, as a homage to Vreeswijk.

Track listing
All songs by Cornelis Vreeswijk, unless otherwise noted.

"Rosenblad, rosenblad" (Cornelis Vreeswijk/Georg Riedel)
 Generalens visa
"Apollinaire"
"Fåglar" (Cornelis Vreeswijk/Björn Lindh)
"Jag" (Cornelis Vreeswijk/Björn Lindh)
 Hajar'u de då Jack?
"Morbror Frans"
 Huvudlösen för aftonen
"Etta"
 Fredmans Epistel no. 81 (Carl Michael Bellman
"Blues för Inga-Maj"
"Ett brev"
 Cool water - på Den Gyldene Freden (Cornelis Vreeswijk/Björn Lindh)
"Ett gammalt bergtroll" (Waldenius, Borgudd, Häggström/Gustaf Fröding
 Sonja och Siw  (Cornelis Vreeswijk/Georg Wadenius)
"Predikan" (Cornelis Vreeswijk/Björn Lindh)
 Elisabeth
"Hemställan"
 En visa till gagga (Cornelis Vreeswijk/Björn Lindh)
"Ågren" (Alf Cranner, Harald Sverdrup, Cornelis Vreeswijk)
"Hopplös blues"
"Skulle iagh söria såå wore iagh tokott"
"Transkription till d'Artagnan"
"Anna själv tredje"
"En viss sorts samba" (Cornelis Vreeswijk/Georg Riedel)

Personnel 
Cornelis Vreeswijk - vocal, guitar
Rune Gustafsson - guitar
Björn J:son Lindh - piano, harpsichord, flute
Georg Wadenius - guitar, bass
Tommy Borgudd - drums
Sten Bergman - keyboards
Palle Danielsson - bass
Rune Carlsson - drums

References

Cornelis Vreeswijk albums
1970 albums
Swedish-language albums